Episcepsis hampsoni is a moth of the family Erebidae. It was described by Walter Rothschild in 1911. It is found in Suriname.

References

Euchromiina
Moths described in 1911